Higger Tor or Higgar Tor is a gritstone tor in the Dark Peak, in the north of the Peak District National Park in England. It overlooks the Burbage Valley and the Iron Age hill fort of Carl Wark to the southeast.

A scene from the 1987 film The Princess Bride was filmed nearby at Carl Wark with Higger Tor visible in the background.

References

Peak District
Hills and edges of South Yorkshire
Mountains and hills of the Peak District
Rock formations of England